Alessandro Del Grosso (born 27 August 1972) is an Italian footballer.

Football career

Early years
Del Grosso started his career at teams of Serie C2. He followed Avezzano promoted to Serie C1 in summer 1996.

Salernitana & Bari
After played 10 matches in Serie C1 1996–97 season, he joined Salernitana of Serie B in November 1996 and followed the team promoted to Serie A in summer 1998.

After Salernitana relegated in summer 1999, he joined A.S. Bari of Serie A on free transfer. After Bari relegated, he rejoined Salernitana in summer 2001, but also at Serie B.

He played for Salernitana for a season.

Catania & Napoli
In summer 2002, he joined Calcio Catania, at that time new promoted to Serie B. He survived in relegation in summer 2003, because that season only one team relegated. He then joined S.S.C. Napoli in on 31 January 2004. But this time Napoli relegated due to financial reason, despite finished 13th in Serie B.

Lega Pro clubs
He then played for Pisa (Serie C1A), Teramo (Serie C1B), Chieti (Serie C1B). He then shortly back to Serie B for Catanzaro on 5 January 2006, but fail to avoid relegation. He then joined Martina (Serie C1B) and then his first club Celano (Serie C2) in January 2007.

He survived in relegation playoffs against Pro Vasto.

References

External links

aic.football.it

1972 births
Living people
People from Ardea, Lazio
Italian footballers
Serie A players
Serie B players
U.S. Salernitana 1919 players
S.S.C. Bari players
Catania S.S.D. players
S.S.C. Napoli players
Pisa S.C. players
S.S. Teramo Calcio players
S.S. Chieti Calcio players
U.S. Catanzaro 1929 players
Association football defenders
A.S.D. Martina Calcio 1947 players
Avezzano Calcio players
Footballers from Lazio
Sportspeople from the Metropolitan City of Rome Capital